John Weisbeck is a former Canadian politician, who served as a BC Liberal Member of the Legislative Assembly of British Columbia from 1996 to 2005, representing the riding of Kelowna-Lake Country.

Weisbeck received his Bachelor of Science degree from the University of British Columbia in 1963 then attained his Doctor of Dental Surgery Degree from the University of Alberta before working as a dentist in Kelowna for 25 years.

In 1988, he was elected as a city councillor for Kelowna City Council where he ended up serving for two terms. He then went on to serve for two terms provincially as the MLA for Okanagan East (unseating Judi Tyabji) and then Kelowna, Lake Country. During his first term, he served as Official Opposition Critic for Advanced Education, Training and Technology. In his final term he served as Deputy Speaker.

Election results

External links 
John Weisbeck

References 

British Columbia Liberal Party MLAs
1943 births
Living people
Canadian dentists
Kelowna city councillors
University of British Columbia alumni
University of Alberta alumni
21st-century Canadian politicians